Eden and After is a 1970 French-Czechoslovak drama art film directed by Alain Robbe-Grillet. It was entered into the 20th Berlin International Film Festival.

Plot 
A group of university students from Bratislava meet after class at a bar called Eden, where, amidst glass walls and reproductions of Piet Mondrian's abstract paintings, they stage ritualistic performances with BDSM themes. Among these young people is Violette, who is the film's protagonist. 

One evening a stranger named Duchemin enters the bar and engages the students in games of magic tricks and tells them anecdotes he has experienced in Africa. Duchemin particularly fascinates Violette, who takes a hallucinogenic substance he offers to her. Violette agrees to meet him in the evening in an abandoned factory. She gets lost in the factory and, after a series of hallucinatory visions, manages to escape next morning, only to find Duchemin dead at the foot of a staircase overlooking the nearby canal. She finds a postcard from Tunisia in his pocket.

Returning home, she discovers that she has been robbed of a valuable painting. She leaves for Tunisia, where she meets a sculptor, Dutchman, who has the same features as Duchemin, and she becomes his lover. She is then kidnapped by a gang of young men, played by some of her fellow students she befriended at Eden. Imprisoned and subjected to torture, she manages to free herself with the help of a girl—her mirror-image or doppelgänger—and recovers her painting. Soon afterward she finds Dutchman dead at the foot of a staircase by the sea, which reminds her of the place where she found Duchemin's body earlier.

Back in Eden, she narrates that nothing has happened yet or perhaps everything was just a fantasy, hallucination, or premonitory dream of hers.

Cast

French release
 Catherine Jourdan as Violette
 Pierre Zimmer as Duchemin
 Richard Leduc as Marc-Antoine
 Lorraine Rainer as Marie-Eve
 Sylvain Corthay as Jean-Pierre
 Juraj Kukura as Boris
 Jarmila Koleničová  as Sona
 Catherine Robbe-Grillet as Foolish woman
 François Gervai
 Ľudovít Kroner  as Franc

Slovak release
Additional credits
 Ida Rapaičová  as Violette/Viola
 Slavo Drozd  as Duchemin/Durman
 Božidara Turzonovová  as Marie-Eve/Mária 
 Ivan Krajíček  as Marc-Antoine/Mikuláš 
 Peter Mikulík  as Jean-Pierre/Róbert

References

External links

1970 films
1970 drama films
1970 multilingual films
1970s French-language films
Films directed by Alain Robbe-Grillet
French multilingual films
Czechoslovak multilingual films
French psychological drama films
French avant-garde and experimental films
Czechoslovak avant-garde and experimental films
French drama films
Slovak drama films
Czechoslovak drama films
1970s French films